Mathias Binder (born 24 July 1972) is a Swiss lightweight rower. He won a gold medal at the 1997 World Rowing Championships in Aiguebelette with the lightweight men's coxless pair.

References

1972 births
Living people
Swiss male rowers
World Rowing Championships medalists for Switzerland
Olympic rowers of Switzerland
Rowers at the 1996 Summer Olympics